Bradley Ira Abelow (born June 9, 1958) is an American businessman and political leader who formerly served as Chief of Staff to the Governor of New Jersey in the cabinet of Governor Jon Corzine. Prior to entering Governor Corzine's Cabinet as State Treasurer, he was a top executive for the Wall Street firm of Goldman Sachs. After working in Corzine's cabinet, he was global chief operating officer of MF Global joining the firm on September 13, 2010

Wall Street Career

He served for 15 years in executive positions with Goldman Sachs, where he worked with Governor Corzine, the investment bank's former CEO. Abelow headed the company's global operations and at one point ran its Hong Kong office. While at Goldman Sachs, Abelow served on the Board of Directors of The Depository Trust & Clearing Corporation.

Treasurer of New Jersey

Abelow formerly served as New Jersey State Treasurer. He was appointed Treasurer by Governor of New Jersey, Jon Corzine and took office on January 23, 2006. In his role as Treasurer, Abelow oversaw the New Jersey Department of the Treasury, and its approximately 4,000 employees across the Treasury's eleven divisions and offices which perform three major functions: Revenue collection and generation, assets management, and statewide support services.

As Treasurer, Abelow held seats on several state boards in New Jersey. In June 2007, he was named the #3 most influential political personality in the state of New Jersey. While at the Treasury, Abelow put together the 2006 and 2007 state budgets and helped craft several initiatives the Corzine Administration launched with regards to fixing the state's financial structure.

Chief of Staff to the Governor

On September 1, 2007, Corzine named Abelow to serve as his chief of staff, replacing Thomas Shea. Abelow was considered an unusual choice for the post since he had no background in New Jersey politics and was primarily a business executive by training. Most of Abelow's predecessors as chief of staff had been long standing New Jersey political operatives, lobbyists and former legislators. 

On December 1, 2008, Abelow was succeeded as chief of staff by Lisa P. Jackson, who had served as the Commissioner of the New Jersey Department of Environmental Protection.

Personal life
Abelow received a Bachelor of Arts (B.A.) degree from Northwestern University, and was awarded an M.B.A. from the Yale School of Management.

Formerly a New York resident, Abelow relocated to Montclair, New Jersey, with his wife and three children.

References

External links 
New Jersey Department of the Treasury official state site
biography
Project Vote Smart – Bradley Abelow (NJ) profile

1958 births
Living people
American financial businesspeople
Northwestern University alumni
People from Montclair, New Jersey
Politicians from New York City
Chiefs of staff to United States state governors
State treasurers of New Jersey
Yale School of Management alumni
The Century Foundation
21st-century American politicians
21st-century American businesspeople
Businesspeople from New York City